Piotr Kirpsza (born 27 May 1989) is a Polish former professional racing cyclist. He rode at the 2014 UCI Road World Championships.

Major results

2010
 7th Overall Carpathia Couriers Paths
 9th Memoriał Andrzeja Trochanowskiego
2011
 5th Overall Carpathia Couriers Paths
2012
 6th Puchar Ministra Obrony Narodowej
2013
 1st Stage 4 (TTT) Dookoła Mazowsza
 2nd Overall Tour de Serbie
1st Points classification
 6th Les Challenges de la Marche Verte – GP Al Massira
2014
 6th Visegrad 4 Bicycle Race – GP Polski
 7th Tour Bohemia
 9th Overall Baltic Chain Tour

References

External links

1989 births
Living people
Polish male cyclists
Place of birth missing (living people)
21st-century Polish people